Daniel Richard Sams (born 27 October 1992) is an Australian international cricketer. He made his international debut for the Australia cricket team in December 2020.

Career
Sams made his first-class cricket debut for New Zealand side Canterbury in the 2017–18 Plunket Shield season on 30 October 2017. He made his Twenty20 debut for Sydney Sixers in the 2017–18 Big Bash League season in December 2017, taking four wickets for fourteen runs, at the time the best figures by a debutant in the tournament. He made his List A debut for New South Wales in the 2018–19 JLT One-Day Cup in September 2018.

In June 2019, Sams was selected to play for the Vancouver Knights franchise team in the 2019 Global T20 Canada tournament. In July 2020, Sams was named in a 26-man preliminary squad of players to begin training ahead of a possible tour to England following the COVID-19 pandemic and was later included in the tour party, although he did not play a match. 

In August 2020, Sams was picked by Delhi Capitals for the 2020 Indian Premier League and at the start of the following season was traded to Royal Challengers Bangalore.

In October 2020, Sams was named in Australia's squad for the limited overs matches against the touring Indian side. He made his Twenty20 International (T20I) debut for in December 2020. In August 2021, Sams was named as one of three players as injury cover in Australia's squad for the 2021 ICC Men's T20 World Cup.

In February 2022, Sams was selected in the Australian squad to play in the five Twenty20 International (T20I) matches against Sri Lanka. Later the same month, he was bought by the Mumbai Indians in the auction for the 2022 Indian Premier League tournament.

References

External links
 

1992 births
Living people
Australian cricketers
Australia Twenty20 International cricketers
Place of birth missing (living people)
Canterbury cricketers
New South Wales cricketers
Sydney Sixers cricketers
Sydney Thunder cricketers
Delhi Capitals cricketers
Royal Challengers Bangalore cricketers
Mumbai Indians cricketers
Essex cricketers
Trent Rockets cricketers
Australian expatriate sportspeople in England
Australian expatriate sportspeople in India
Australian expatriate cricketers
Cricketers from Sydney